Sport in Ottawa, Canada's capital, has a history dating back to the 19th century. Ottawa is now home to five professional sports teams: the Ottawa Senators of the National Hockey League; the Ottawa Redblacks of the Canadian Football League; the Ottawa Titans of the Frontier League; the Ottawa Blackjacks of the Canadian Elite Basketball League; and Atlético Ottawa of the Canadian Premier League. Several non-professional teams also play in Ottawa, including the Ottawa 67's junior hockey team and other semi-professional and collegiate teams in various sports.

Sports teams in Ottawa

Professional teams 
Ottawa has two teams that are part of the North American major professional league, including the Ottawa Senators (NHL), Ottawa RedBlacks (CFL).

Semi-professional and amateur teams

Post-secondary athletics 
There are two public universities in Ottawa that presently operate a varsity program. They include the University of Ottawa (est. 1848 )and the Carleton University (est. 1942). The athletic programs of the two universities are a part of the Ontario University Athletics program, which itself is a member of U Sports.

Facilities used by university athletic programs based in Ottawa includes:

Sports

Ice hockey

Ice hockey began in Ottawa with the Stanley Cup in 1893. The city dominated the hockey world during the first quarter of the 20th century, with Ottawa teams winning 11 Cups from 1903 to 1927. The original Ottawa Senators were one of the original members of the National Hockey League which was founded in 1917. The team folded during the Great Depression in 1934, and moved to St. Louis to become the St. Louis Eagles. The Senators returned to the National Hockey League in 1992. They play at the Canadian Tire Centre in Kanata.

In junior hockey the city is represented by the Ottawa 67's of the Ontario Hockey League. The team began play in 1967, Canada's centennial year. Ottawa played host to the Memorial Cup tournament in 1972 and 1999. Ottawa also played host to the 2009 World Junior Ice Hockey Championships.

Ottawa also has a minor hockey program, and plays host to the Bell Capital Cup each year. The city is home to five teams in the Central Junior Hockey League, four teams in the Eastern Ontario Junior Hockey League and two teams in the Eastern Ontario Junior C Hockey League.

Canadian football
The Ottawa Rough Riders were a Canadian Football League team that was founded in 1876 and would prove to be one of the oldest tenured sports franchises in North America. The team won nine Grey Cup championships over its long history but due to poor team play, poor attendance records and even worse management, the Rough Riders folded after the 1996 season, ending 120 years of professional football in Ottawa.

Five years later, a CFL expansion franchise was granted to the City of Ottawa. The team, called the Ottawa Renegades, began play in 2002, but folded in 2006 after just four seasons, due again to poor management. Less than two years later, in March 2008, a new franchise was awarded to the Ottawa Sports and Entertainment Group, led by Jeff Hunt, to begin play in 2010. The franchise was conditional upon reconstruction of Frank Clair Stadium, leading to a four-year delay for the team. The third iteration of professional football in Ottawa, the Ottawa Redblacks, began play in 2014, playing in the newly refurbished TD Place Stadium.

The University of Ottawa Gee-Gees football teams have won two Vanier Cups with their first in 1975 and then again in 2000. Carleton University also had a football team from 1945–1998, but the program was cancelled after the 1998 season. There have since been efforts to revive the program, with the football team being approved for Ontario University Athletics membership beginning in 2013. The rivalry between the two schools is heated, and the annual game between the two teams is known as the Panda Game.

The city also has two junior teams. The Ottawa Sooners play in the Canadian Junior Football League while the Ottawa Junior Riders play in the Quebec Junior Football League.

Baseball 
Ottawa has had three International League franchises in its history. The Ottawa Giants (1951), the Ottawa Athletics (1952–1955) and most recently, the Ottawa Lynx (1993–2007). The Lynx were once very popular in the city, leading the league in attendance in its inaugural season, but attendance dropped and the team moved to the Lehigh Valley. The Lynx won the Governors' Cup in 1995.

Baseball was revived in Ottawa for the 2008 season, when the Ottawa Rapidz were founded in the independent Can-Am League. However, the team lasted just one season, as it folded, citing high rent for the stadium, despite respectable attendance.

Baseball returned to Ottawa from 2010 to 2012 with the addition of the Ottawa Fat Cats of the Intercounty Baseball League, but they folded before the 2013 IBL season.

The Ottawa Champions were founded in 2014 and began play in 2015. However, when the Can-Am League merged with the Frontier League in 2019, the Champions were left off the 2020 schedule. Ottawa joined the Frontier League again in the form of the Ottawa Titans who were founded in 2020 and will begin play in 2022 at Raymond Chabot Grant Thornton Park.

Ottawa is also home to the largest amateur baseball league in Canada – the National Capital Baseball League (www.nationalcapitalbaseball.com). The league is a wooden bat league with 37 teams in 4 tiers (as of 2012).

Basketball
Basketball in Ottawa began with the Ottawa SkyHawks, a professional basketball team that played in the National Basketball League of Canada in 2013. They later folded in 2014. The Ottawa Blackjacks are a new professional basketball team established in 2019. They will play in the Canadian Elite Basketball League (CEBL) beginning in the 2020 season.

Both Carleton University and the University of Ottawa sport varsity men's teams. The U Sports Men's Basketball Championship has been held in Ottawa from 2008 to 2010 and 2013 to 2014. The city plays host to the Capital Hoops Classic every January where both university teams play at Canadian Tire Centre. The first classic set a record for the highest attended university game in Canadian history.

Soccer
Soccer has been played in Ottawa for over 100 years. Ottawa is active with youth competitive, youth development and adult recreational leagues. The most prominent team was the Ottawa Fury Women, a women's semi-professional team. The Ottawa Fury played in the semi-professional Premier Development League from 2005 to 2013, when the Ottawa Sports and Entertainment group launched a professional men's team in 2014, the Ottawa Fury FC, which played in the second-division United Soccer League (USL) until its dissolution in 2019. The Canadian Premier League announced in 2020 that Atlético Ottawa will be their 8th franchise in the league, owned by Spanish club Atlético Madrid. Their home is at Lansdowne Park in a redeveloped TD Place Stadium.

Australian Rules Football 
Australian Rules Football started in 2008 when the Ottawa Swans joined the Ontario Australian Football League (OAFL).

Curling
The city is home to 15 curling clubs, more than any other municipality in eastern Canada. The city has hosted four Briers and one Tournament of Hearts. The 2001 Nokia Brier was the most attended Brier ever in Eastern Canada at the time. Ottawa has sent four teams to the Brier to represent Ontario: Eldon Coombe (1972), Earle Morris (1985), Rich Moffatt (1999) and Bryan Cochrane (2003). Ottawa has also sent 15 teams to the Tournament of Hearts: Helen Hanright (1964), Dawn Ventura (1974 and 1976), Anne Merklinger (1993, 1994, 1998 and 2000) Jenn Hanna (2005 and 2016), Rachel Homan (2011, 2013, 2014, 2015, 2017 and 2019).  Homan skipped the first Ottawa-based team to win a women's or a men's national championship when she led her Ottawa Curling Club team to a championship at the 2013 Scotties Tournament of Hearts. She won national titles again in 2014 and in 2017. Ottawa also hosted the 2017 Canadian Olympic Curling Trials which was won by Homan, who represented Canada the 2018 Winter Olympics.

Each year, Ottawa hosts one of the largest curling tournaments in the world, the OVCA Ottawa Men's Bonspiel (more commonly known as the "City of Ottawa bonspiel") which has been held since 1956. Ottawa is home to one of the oldest curling clubs in the world, the Ottawa Curling Club which was founded in 1851.

Curling in the Ottawa area is overseen by the Ottawa Valley Curling Association.

Gaelic football 
Gaelic football has been present in the capital since the formation of the men's team, the Ottawa Gaels, in 1974 by Pat Kelly and Larry Bradley. The ladies team was formed in 1984 by Breda Kelly and has been dominant in the Toronto GAA (Gaelic Athletic Association) for the last decade. Minor players have played at the Continental Youth Championships in the USA.

Horse racing
Connaught Park Racetrack, located in Aylmer, Quebec operated from 1913 until its closure in 2008. It operated thoroughbred racing until the 1950s, and offered harness racing afterwards. In the early 1960s, Rideau Carleton Raceway was opened south of Ottawa, and it continues to operate a season of harness racing annually, along with off-track betting and gambling. Races have been held on the frozen Rideau Canal and the frozen Ottawa River. 
Canada has its own breed of horse, in 2002 the Canadian horse became national, it added to the list of «Heritage Livestock Canada».

Hurling
Since 2012, Ottawa has had an active amateur Hurling team made up of both local and Irish players. The team is called the Eire Og Ottawa Hurling Club. Games are played frequently against Montreal Shamrocks GAC. The team also competes in other larger tournaments administered by the Canadian GAA.

Ultimate frisbee
Ottawa has one of the world's largest ultimate frisbee communities dating back to the founding of the Ottawa-Carleton Ultimate Association in 1986.  Ottawa has hosted the Canadian Ultimate Championships six times, most recently in 2017.

Rowing
The Ottawa Rowing Club was founded on 6 June 1867,. One of its founders and first patron was Sir John A. Macdonald; other members of the first executive committee included Robert Lyon (politician), mayor of Ottawa, and; Allan Gilmour, businessman in the shipping and timber industries. The original club house was a wooden building, initially built on pontoons, and moored to the shore of the Ottawa river at the foot of parliament hill, between the Rideau canal and the Chaudière falls. Whilst the view from the club house over the Chaudière falls was picturesque, the rowing conditions were difficult: vast field of sawdust and other refuse from an immense lumber mill situated about the falls, and logs escaping from the booms. Each spring, along with the melting ice, the club house floated downstream and came aground. Every year it was brought back up near the Rideau canal. In the early 1870s, the ORC ceased to exist before being re-introduced on 25 June 1875 with approximately 100 members.

In 1884 and 1885, the club house suffered important damage when it sank. Members of the Ottawa Rowing Club, led by P. D. Ross, discussed building a permanent foundation for the club boat house in 1887. In spring 1896, the members of the Club decided to purchase a piece of the river front property at 10 Lady Grey Drive and leave the club house in its current, permanent location.

For six consecutive years, from 1905 to 1911, members of the club were the North American champions. The two world wars were difficult years for the club, with fourteen members of the club losing their lives while serving during World War I and with the shell house being neglected and showing signs of deterioration.

During the Depression years, P.D. Ross, former editor of the defunct Ottawa Journal, was president of the club. He infuriated his reporters by paying them small salaries while openly spending into equipment and upkeep for the rowing club.

In 1949, the Ottawa Rowing Club accepted to contribute to the development of the rowing program at the University of Ottawa by offering equipment and coaches. However, the 1950s and 1960s was a period of decline for the Ottawa Rowing Club. After seizing Club due to financial constraints, the City of Ottawa agreed to restore in 1967 the part of the old shell house that exists today but decided to demolish the other half of the building due to its poor condition (that portion of the building stored boats and included a ballroom). On that year, there were only nine members of the Club and the permanent closure of the club was being debated.

Volunteers, such as Peter King, supported the development of rowing in Ottawa in the 1970s. The rowing boom resulted in two new clubs (that do not exist anymore): the Nepean Rowing Club and the Ottawa Carleton Rowing School. With close to 1000 members, the Ottawa Rowing Club is one of the largest rowing club in Canada. It hosts three regatta per year.

Rugby league
It was announced on 9 March 2020 that the Ottawa Aces, a new professional rugby league team, will play in the 2021 RFL League 1 competition.

Events hosted
1903 Stanley Cup Challenge
1904 Stanley Cup Challenge
1905 Stanley Cup
1908 Stanley Cup Challenge
1909 Stanley Cup
1910 Stanley Cup Challenge
1911 Stanley Cup
1915 Stanley Cup Finals
1920 Stanley Cup Finals
1921 Stanley Cup Finals
1922 Canadian Figure Skating Championships
1923 Stanley Cup Finals
1925 Grey Cup
1927 Stanley Cup Finals
1931 Memorial Cup
1939 Grey Cup
1940 Canadian Figure Skating Championships
1940 Grey Cup
1949 Canadian Figure Skating Championships
1953 Canadian Figure Skating Championships
1958 Canadian Figure Skating Championships
1958 Memorial Cup
1961 Diamond D Championship 
1967 Grey Cup
1972 Memorial Cup
1976 Skate Canada International
1979 Macdonald Brier
1981 Skate Canada International
1987 Canadian Figure Skating Championships
1988 Grey Cup
1990 Scott Tournament of Hearts
1990 IIHF Women's World Championship
1993 Labatt Brier
1993 Skate Canada International
1996 Canadian Figure Skating Championships
1999 Canadian Figure Skating Championships
1999 Memorial Cup
2001 Nokia Brier
2001 Jeux de la Francophonie
2003 Canadian Junior Curling Championships
2004 Grey Cup
2005 NHL Entry Draft
2006 Canadian Figure Skating Championships
2006 Canadian Track and Field Championships
2007 Stanley Cup Finals
2008 CIS Men's Basketball Championship
2008 NHL Entry Draft
2008 Skate Canada International
2009 World Junior Ice Hockey Championships
2009 CIS Men's Basketball Championship
2010 Canadian National Fencing Championships
2010 CIS Men's Basketball Championship
2012 NHL All-Star Game
2013 CIS Men's Basketball Championship
2013 CIS Men's Basketball Championship
2013 IIHF Women's World Championship
2014 CIS Men's Basketball Championship
2016 Tim Hortons Brier
2017 Canadian Figure Skating Championships
2017 Canadian Track and Field Championships
2017 Canadian Olympic Curling Trials
2017 Grey Cup
2018 Canadian Track and Field Championships
2022 CEBL Championship

Awards 
Ottawa has a hall of fame honouring local athletes. There are also the "Ottawa Sports Awards" awarded annually to the top athletes in the city.

Past sports teams

References

 
Sports
Sports teams in Ottawa
Ice hockey in Ottawa